Cristian Andrés Campozano (born 17 June 1985 in Formosa) is an Argentine footballer, who plays for Sportivo Patria. The striker has previously played for Dinamo Tirana in Albania and Municipal Iquique.

References

1985 births
Living people
Argentine footballers
Argentine expatriate footballers
FK Dinamo Tirana players
Deportes Iquique footballers
San Luis de Quillota footballers
Expatriate footballers in Chile
Expatriate footballers in Albania
Association football forwards
People from Formosa, Argentina